Leslie "Les" Jones (born 19 July 1948) is an English former professional rugby league footballer who played in the 1960s, 1970s and 1980s.

Background
Les Jones was born in Blackbrook, St. Helens, Lancashire, England.

Playing career

International honours
Les Jones won a cap for England while at St. Helens in 1977 against Wales, and won a cap for Great Britain while at St. Helens in 1971 against New Zealand.

World Club Challenge appearances
Les Jones played , i.e. number 2, in St. Helens' 2–25 defeat by the 1975 NSWRFL season premiers, Eastern Suburbs Roosters in the unofficial 1976 World Club Challenge at Sydney Cricket Ground on Tuesday 29 June 1976.

Challenge Cup Final appearances
Les Jones played , i.e. number 2, in St. Helens' 16–13 victory over Leeds in the 1972 Challenge Cup Final during the 1971–72 season at Wembley Stadium, London on Saturday 13 May 1972, and in the 20–5 victory over Widnes in the 1976 Challenge Cup Final during the 1975–76 season at Wembley Stadium, London on Saturday 8 May 1976.

County Cup Final appearances
Les Jones played , i.e. number 5, (replacing Tony Barrow who had played in the original final) and scored a try in the 13–10 victory over Warrington in the 1967 Lancashire County Cup Final replay during the 1967–68 season at Station Road, Swinton on Saturday 2 December 1967, and played , i.e. number 2, in the 4–7 defeat by Leigh in the 1970 Lancashire County Cup Final during the 1970–71 season at Station Road, Swinton on Saturday 28 November 1970.

BBC2 Floodlit Trophy Final appearances
Les Jones played , i.e. number 2, and scored a try in St. Helens' 5–9 defeat by Leeds in the 1970 BBC2 Floodlit Trophy Final during the 1970–71 season at Headingley Rugby Stadium, Leeds on Tuesday 15 December 1970, played  in the 8–2 victory over Rochdale Hornets in the 1971 BBC2 Floodlit Trophy Final during the 1971–72 season at Headingley Rugby Stadium, Leeds on Tuesday 14 December 1971, played  in the 22–2 victory over Dewsbury in the 1975 BBC2 Floodlit Trophy Final during the 1975–76 season at Knowsley Road, St. Helens on Tuesday 16 December 1975, played  in the 11–26 defeat by Hull Kingston Rovers in the 1977 BBC2 Floodlit Trophy Final during the 1977–78 season at Craven Park, Kingston upon Hull on Tuesday 13 December 1977, and played  in the 7–13 defeat by Widnes in the 1978 BBC2 Floodlit Trophy Final during the 1978–79 season at Knowsley Road, St. Helens on Tuesday 12 December 1978.

Career records
With 282-tries, only one player has scored more tries for St. Helens than Les Jones, he is Tom van Vollenhoven with 392-tries.

References

External links
St Helens Heritage Society profile

1948 births
Living people
England national rugby league team players
English rugby league players
Great Britain national rugby league team players
Lancashire rugby league team players
Rugby league centres
Rugby league players from St Helens, Merseyside
Rugby league wingers
St Helens R.F.C. players